Abrothallus secedens is a species of lichenicolous fungus in the family Abrothallaceae. Found in Africa, South America, and the United States, it was formally described as a new species in 1994 by Swedish lichenologists Mats Wedin and Rolf Santesson. It has also been collected in Chile, Kenya, and Alaska. The species epithet of the fungus, secedens ("splitting apart") refers to the two-celled ascospores that eventually separate into single-celled part spores. Known hosts for Abrothallus secedens include Crocodia aurata, Pseudocyphellaria dubia, P. mallota, P. obvoluta, and other Pseudocyphellaria lichens not identified to species.

References

secedens
Fungi described in 1994
Fungi of Africa
Fungi of South America
Fungi of the United States
Lichenicolous fungi
Taxa named by Rolf Santesson